Kyle J. Donahue (born May 6, 2000) is an American professional stock car racing driver. He last competed part-time in the NASCAR Gander RV & Outdoors Truck Series, driving the No. 00 truck for Reaume Brothers Racing.

He is the younger brother of fellow NASCAR driver Kevin Donahue.

Racing career

Truck Series
In 2016, Donahue made his Camping World Truck Series debut along with his brother Kevin at the Texas Roadhouse 200 at Martinsville, driving the No. 63 truck for MB Motorsports. He started 22nd and finished 31st due to a crash early in the race. This was Donahue's only start in 2016.

In 2017, Donahue returned for 3 races, driving the No. 63 truck for MB Motorsports. He finished 16th at Martinsville, 16th at Gateway, and 26th at Iowa.

In 2018, Donahue drove the No. 83 truck for Copp Motorsports at Martinsville. This time, he started 22nd and finished 23rd.

Motorsports career results

NASCAR
(key) (Bold – Pole position awarded by qualifying time. Italics – Pole position earned by points standings or practice time. * – Most laps led.)

Gander RV & Outdoors Truck Series

 Season still in progress
 Ineligible for series points

References

External links
 

NASCAR drivers
2000 births
People from Chesterfield, Missouri
Racing drivers from Missouri
Racing drivers from St. Louis
Living people